Homelake is an unincorporated community and a U.S. Post Office located in Rio Grande County, Colorado, United States.  The Homelake Post Office has the ZIP Code 81135.

History 
Homelake is the former location of the Colorado Soldiers' and Sailors' Home and is the location of the Homelake Civil War Cemetery.

Geography
Homelake is located at  (37.574515,-106.095829).

Homelake is north of combined US Route 160 and US Route 285 on State Highway 6.

References

External links
  Homelake S&S Home

Unincorporated communities in Rio Grande County, Colorado
Unincorporated communities in Colorado